"I've Been Lonely for So Long" is a pop-soul song recorded by American southern soul singer Frederick Knight in 1972. It was written by his wife, Posie Knight, and Jerry Weaver.  It was released as a single and peaked at number 27 on the Billboard pop chart, number 8 on the R&B chart and number 23 on the British pop chart in 1972.  It was also released on his 1973 album of the same name.

Chart performance

Other versions 
 Mick Jagger, on his 1993 solo album Wandering Spirit
 Paul Young during sessions for his 1983 album No Parlez
 Peter Blakeley recorded the song, under the shortened title "I've Been Lonely", for his 1993 album The Pale Horse, and as a single, which reached #61 on the Australian ARIA chart.
 Black Grape, on their 1997 album Stupid Stupid Stupid
 Lambchop, on their 1998 album What Another Man Spills
 John Farnham, on his 2000 album 33⅓
 Hazmat Modine, on their 2011 album Cicada

References 

1972 singles
Soul songs
1972 songs
Stax Records singles
Paul Young songs